
Springfield-Greene County Library District (SGCL) is a library system that operates in both Springfield, Missouri and Greene County, Missouri. Springfield and Greene County Libraries operated as separate entities until 1961, when the Greene County Library board began contracting services from the Springfield Public Library. Boards from both the Springfield Public Library and the Greene County Library decided that it would be more effective to operate as one entity and merged in 1971 becoming the Springfield-Greene County Library District.

The first library in the district was built with a grant from Andrew Carnegie in 1903 and served as the main district library until 1999 when the Library Center opened to accommodate district growth. The district is governed by a nine-member board of directors. Five of the members are appointed by the Springfield Mayor and the other four are appointed by the Greene County Commission for county representation.

The district is funded primarily through county property taxes, grants, private gifts and funds from The Library Foundation along with proceeds from two semi-annual books sales by the Friends of the Library.

History 
The construction of the first library was funded  with a $50,000 contribution from Andrew Carnegie in 1903. It opened, as the Springfield Public Library, in 1905 with 700 books and an annual circulation of 8,657. The building served as the main library for the Springfield Library-Greene County district until 1999. It underwent major renovations in early 2000 to convert it to a neighborhood branch to reflect the way it looked in the 1930s. At this time it was renamed the Midtown Carnegie Branch.

In 1945, Ash Grove opened the Ash Grove City Library. The Greene County Library opened in 1951. In 1956, Ash Grove City Library became part of the Greene County Library. Finally in 1971, the Springfield Library and the Greene County Library merged to become the Springfield-Greene County Library system.

Locations 
The Springfield-Greene County Library District has 10 branches and a Mobile Library.

Five of the district's ten branches are located in Springfield these include:

 The Library Center
 Schweitzer Brentwood Branch Library
 The Library Station
 Midtown Carnegie Branch Library
 Park Central Branch Library

The other five branches are located throughout Greene County

 Ash Grove Branch Library
 Fair Grove Branch Library
 Republic Branch Library
 Strafford Branch Library
 Willard Branch Library

Services 
The branches offer free WiFi on public computers, and comfortable, convenient places for study and exploration. The Library Center, the headquarters branch, includes a Local History & Genealogy Department used by genealogy researchers nationwide. The Edge Community Technology Center in the Midtown Carnegie Branch offers free, instructor-led and tutorial classes in computer and software skills. The Edge also has a 3-D printer and a Media Lab for audio and video production for the public. The Funding and Business Information Center houses sources of grant funding for entrepreneurs and nonprofits as a member of the national Foundation Directory Online. The Library also has dozens of online databases including a language learning system, sign language instruction, business research, newspapers and magazine articles on a variety of topics

Programs 
Daily preschool storytimes focus on the district's signature early literacy program, Racing to Read, at the branches and offsite. ‘Tween and teen activities encourage creative expression; and all ages are welcome to the annual Summer Reading Program, live concerts, book discussions, live theater, art exhibits.

References

External links 
 Springfield-Greene County Library District website

Education in Springfield, Missouri
Education in Greene County, Missouri